The economy of New South Wales represents a significant proportion of the Australian economy. The economy was valued at $557.9 billion in 2016–17, representing 33.0% of Australia's total GDP.

Economic history 
Aboriginal Australians generally lived within a hunter-gatherer economic system. The European settlement of New South Wales began in 1788 as a  convict economy, with human capital hired out to private entrepreneurs, and government and the military dominating the colony.
Successive commodity booms (and busts) in  whaling,  sealing, wool,  gold and wheat characterised the 19th century and fostered a thriving colonial capitalism.

Revenue 
At the time of  Federation in 1901, New South Wales was a free-trading state (as opposed to protectionist) with a broad revenue-base including income tax. The state earned more revenue than it needed to run its services. This situation reversed during World War II (1939-1945) when the Commonwealth took responsibility for the collection of income tax. Following the war, the states attempted to re-enter the income-tax field but were rebuffed by  High Court rulings (Income Tax decisions).

The loss of income-tax collection meant NSW became totally dependent on Federal Government funding in order to deliver the services it was constitutionally entitled to do (e.g. health, primary/secondary education, transport). It also forced a greater reliance on indirect taxes - such as excise duty on cigarettes, alcohol, and gambling. This was challenged by an individual who argued that the constitution forbade the states from collecting taxation in this way. The High Court upheld the complaint and the Commonwealth was forced to collect these excises on behalf of the states. Since NSW expends far more than it can ever earn, it has little choice but to comply with Commonwealth demands.

Australia's largest economy 
NSW has the largest economy in Australia, valued at $558 billion in 2016-17 or about 33% of Australia's GDP. This is one third larger than that of the next State and Sydney alone accounts for almost one quarter of Australia's GDP.

The NSW economy is larger than each of the national economies of South Africa, Thailand, Malaysia, Colombia, the Philippines or Ukraine.

NSW has a diversified and knowledge intensive economy. In Australia it accounts for:

46% of the Australia's finance and insurance industry
39% of the property and business services industry
50% of the film and television production industry
33% of the communications industry
33% of the manufacturing industry.

NSW has the largest manufacturing industry in Australia, contributing $31.4 billion in 2005–06 to the State's economy.

NSW is home to more than 65% of all Asia Pacific regional headquarters located in Australia, which accounts to more than 600 companies.

About 600 contact centre companies operate 60,000 seats in NSW, 42% of the total for contact centres in Australia. Of all international multilingual contact centres in the Asia Pacific, 32% are in NSW.

Employment in the financial services industry in Sydney is now nearly half the size of London's and more than one-third the size of New York City's.

In Australia NSW is home to:

81% of Asia Pacific finance and insurance regional offices
80% of domestic and foreign bank headquarters
73% of property and business services regional offices
60% of manufacturing regional headquarters
76% of all information and communications technologies (ICT) regional headquarters
46% of information and communications technology (ICT) businesses
80% of multinational pharmaceutical companies in Australia and 70% of pharmaceutical companies with regional headquarters
about 48% of the national market capitalisation of ASX listed biotechnology companies. These 41 companies have a market value of $11.65 billion.

Growing economy 
In 2005–06, just under 39,000 new companies registered in NSW, compared with 38,000 in Victoria and fewer than 25,000 in Queensland.

NSW also has many more companies overall than the other States. Over 510,000 companies are registered in NSW with the Australian Securities and Investments Commission, almost 50,000 more than in Victoria and 269,000 more than Queensland.

Investment climate 
Business investment in NSW reached $39.5 billion in the 2005-06 financial year, a rise of 9.2% compared with the previous year. Over the same period NSW represented 28% of Australia's total business investment.

Capital spending on machinery and equipment by NSW businesses rose by 8.3% to $20.5 billion, encouraged by high levels of capacity utilisation and strong profitability.

Engineering and commercial building construction reached $14.1 billion in the 2005-06 financial year, an increase of 12.4% over 2004–05.

Businesses in NSW also increased their spending on intangible fixed assets, mostly in computer software and mineral exploration, with an investment of $4.3 billion, up by 7.7% in 2005–06.

Since April 1999, the Department of State and Regional Development (DSRD) has facilitated over $10.1 billion in new private sector investment, and helped to create and retain more than 49,100 jobs. This includes 29,600 jobs and over $6.3 billion worth of investment in regional NSW.

Exports 
In 2005-06 NSW recorded $17.4 billion or 42 per cent of Australia's total services exports.

In 2005–06, total goods and services exports from NSW amounted to more than $44 billion, with the five largest exports being:

travel services (19%) – goods and services purchased by travellers and foreign workers
coal and coke (11.4%)
transportation services (7.5%) - freight and domestic travel for non-residents
non-ferrous metals (5.4%) – largely copper and aluminium
metal ores and metal scrap (4.7%).

NSW merchandise (goods) exports for 2005-06 were worth A$26.8 billion, up 16.5 per cent on 2004–05.

In 2005–06, manufactured exports from NSW totalled $10.6 billion and accounted for 40% of the State's merchandise exports. Total elaborately transformed manufactures amounted to $7.1 billion in 2005, with significant contributions from medicinal and pharmaceutical products, and professional, scientific and controlling instruments.

Agriculture 

Agriculture is spread throughout the eastern two-thirds of New South Wales.

 is the most extensive crop in the state by hectare amounting to 39% of the continent's harvest. As such the Puccinia graminis f. sp. tritici (Pgt) strain Ug99 is a tremendous forward looking concern and Plant Health Australia, Grains Research & Development Corporation (GRDC), and the Plant Biosecurity Cooperative Research Centre have already begun preparing for its arrival. Sydney is a major port for the export of Australian wheat.  DPI is concerned about foreign biotypes of wheat pathogens carrying virulence genes not yet a burden for Australians, including Ug99.

Pgt standard race 126 was the most common race here from 1929 to 1941, as it was for the whole of Australia. First detected on Tasmania in 1954, standard race 21 was the most common race by the next year in the southern part of this state, Victoria, and Tasmania.

Cattle, sheep and pigs are the predominant types of livestock produced in NSW and they have been present since their importation during the earliest days of European settlement. Economically the state is the most important state in Australia, with about one-third of the country's sheep, one-fifth of its cattle, and one-third of its small number of pigs. New South Wales produces a large share of Australia's hay, fruit, legumes, lucerne, maize, nuts, wool, wheat, oats, oilseeds (about 51%), poultry, rice (about 99%), vegetables, fishing including oyster farming, and forestry including wood chips. Bananas and sugar are grown chiefly in the Clarence, Richmond and Tweed River areas. Wool is produced on the Northern Tablelands as well as prime lambs and beef cattle.

The cotton industry is centred in the Namoi Valley in northwestern New South Wales.

On the central slopes there are many orchards, with the principal fruits grown being apples, cherries and pears. However, the fruit industry is threatened by the Queensland fruit fly (Bactrocera tryoni) which causes more than $28.5 million a year in damage to Australian crops, primarily in Queensland and northern New South Wales.

Approximately  of vineyards lie across the eastern region of the state with wines produced in the Hunter Valley with the Riverina being the largest wine producer in New South Wales. Australia's largest and most valuable Thoroughbred horse breeding area is centred on Scone in the Hunter Valley.  (Erysiphe necator, syn. Uncinula necator),  (Plasmopara viticola), and Gray Mold (Botrytis cinerea) are common fungal diseases of grape here. Fungicides are commonly used in this crop and so fungicide resistance and resistance management are a concern. DPI provides recommendations on these and other topics for producers.

As with the entire world, the most popular rodenticide is warfarin although some warfarin resistance is found here. DPI recommends rodenticides including alternatives for resistant targets.

About half of Australia's timber production is in New South Wales. Large areas of the state are now being replanted with eucalyptus forests

Under the Water Management Act 2000, updated riparian water rights were given to those within NSW with livestock. Under the Act, "an owner or occupier of a landholding is entitled to take water from a river, estuary or lake which fronts their land or from an aquifer which is underlying their land for domestic consumption and stock watering without the need for an access licence."

40% of Australia's lucerne (Medicago sativa, alfalfa) is grown here. Due to the introduction of the spotted alfalfa aphid (Therioaphis maculata) in the 1700s all varieties grown here must be resistant to it (see also ).

The Flow Hive was invented here and the company is operated here.

In the late 1970s  had become so severe that the government convened a committee to advise them. The Stock Medicines Board formed a committee from University of New England, CSIRO, the Agriculture Department, University of Sydney, and the Victoria Department of Agriculture. The state's stations are so numerous  and modern drugs so vital to modern production  that  in livestock parasites of sheep, goats, and horses had become widespread. (In fact the first known example of any anthelminthic resistance in the country was against thiabendazole (TBZ) in Haemonchus contortus of sheep in the Northern Tablelands, reported by Smeal et al., 1968.) The committee found that by the late '70s bendazole resistances were common in H. contortus, Trichostrongylus colubriformis, and Ostertagia circumcincta spp. of sheep and Strongylidae spp. of horse. They advised that resistance would continue to develop and could not be avoided, and so resistance management would be a constant companion for the industry in the future.

See also 
Economy of Sydney
Economy of Australia
New South Wales wine
NSW Business Chamber

Data 

Source: dfat fact sheet

References

External links
Agriculture - Statistics - New South Wales
NSW Economy
Economical and Financial Statement Morris Iemma MP 23 February 2006.